Edward O'Reilly may refer to:
 Edward O'Reilly (scholar) (1765–1830), Irish scholar
 Tex O'Reilly (1880–1946), American mercenary
 Edward O'Reilly (Massachusetts politician)